Hypomecis cineracea is a species from the genus Hypomecis.

References

Boarmiini